UTC+07:30 is an identifier for a time offset from UTC of +07:30.

History
UTC+07:30 was used both as daylight saving time as well as standard time later in Peninsular Malaysia and Singapore. Between 1941 and 1942 before the Japanese occupation, and from 1945 to 1965 after the occupation, Peninsular Malaysia and Singapore used UTC+07:30 as daylight saving time. It was later in 1965 when Singapore decided to declare UTC+07:30 as its standard time.

The Malaysian government announced in December 1981 that it would adjust Peninsular Malaysia’s time by 30 minutes on 1 January 1982 in order to keep common time with East Malaysia. In view of Singapore’s close relations with Malaysia and also to prevent confusion for travellers and businessmen, the Singapore government made a very quick decision to follow suit.

UTC+08:00 is the current time zone for Malaysia and Singapore and this standard time has been in use since 1982.

See also
Singapore Standard Time
Time in Malaysia
UTC+07:20

References 

UTC offsets
Time in Singapore